The Independent on Saturday is an English-language South African newspaper, part of Independent News & Media. It was launched in 1998 to replace the Saturday Paper, which was formed in the mid-1990s after the demise of the Saturday editions of the Daily News and the Mercury. The Independent on Saturday circulates primarily in the greater Durban area, but is also distributed to other parts of the KwaZulu-Natal province.

Distribution areas

Distribution figures

Readership figures

See also
 List of newspapers in South Africa

References

External links
 
 SAARF Website

Independent News & Media
Mass media in Durban
Weekly newspapers published in South Africa
Publications established in 1998
1998 establishments in South Africa
Saturday newspapers